CrimethInc., also known as CWC, which stands for either "CrimethInc. Ex-Workers Collective" or "CrimethInc Ex-Workers Ex-Collective", is a decentralized anarchist collective of autonomous cells. CrimethInc. emerged in the mid-1990s, initially as the hardcore  zine Inside Front, and began operating as a collective in 1996. It has since published widely read articles and zines for the anarchist movement and distributed posters and books of its own publication.

CrimethInc. cells have published books, released records, and organized national campaigns against globalization and representative democracy in favor of radical community organizing. Less public splinter groups have carried out direct action (including arson and hacktivism), hosted international conventions and other events, maintained local chapters, sparked riots, and toured with multimedia performance art or hardcore anarcho-punk musical ensembles. The collective has received national media and academic attention, as well as criticism and praise from other anarchists for its activities and philosophy. CrimethInc. has an association with the North American anarcho-punk scene due to its relationship with artists in the genre and its publishing of Inside Front as well as more recently the contemporary anti-capitalist movement.

Activities
Activities by CrimethInc. cells have toured with hardcore anarcho-punk musical ensembles. In 2002, a cell in Olympia, Washington staged a five-day film festival with skill-sharing workshops and screenings. Cells have also supported various large-scale campaigns with publicity work, including the "Unabomber for President" and the "Don't Just (Not) Vote" election campaigns as well as the protests against the Free Trade Area of the Americas of 2003 in Miami, Florida. Individuals adopting the CrimethInc. nom de guerre  have included convicted ELF arsonists, as well as hacktivists who successfully attacked the websites of DARE, Republican National Committee, and sites related to U.S. President George W. Bush's 2004 re-election campaign. These activities have earned the collective irregular attention from the mainstream news media. Several CrimethInc. cells have worked in collaboration with other anti-capitalists and anarchists to promote Steal Something From Work Day every April 15, which coincides with the United States Tax Day, to protest exploitation in the workplace.

Publications

The creation of propaganda has been described as the collective's core function. Among their best-known publications are the books Days of War, Nights of Love, Expect Resistance, Evasion, Recipes for Disaster: An Anarchist Cookbook, the pamphlets To Change Everything: an Anarchist Appeal (available in paper, PDF and video form), and Fighting For Our Lives (of which, to date, they claim to have printed 600,000 copies), the hardcore punk/political zine Inside Front, and the music of hardcore punk bands. Several websites are maintained by individual cells, including Crimethinc.com, operated by the Far East Cell, which hosts propaganda, excerpts from available publications, and a blog of the activities of other cells. CrimethInc. is connected to publishing collectives/organizations with similar ideas, notably the Curious George Brigade, which has written a number of publications including Anarchy in the Age of Dinosaurs. In 2005, they began publishing a half-gloss journal, Rolling Thunder, with the byline "An Anarchist Journal of Dangerous Living", which released its eighth issue in 2009. CrimethInc. texts have received wide coverage in the anarchist media and in academic publications, and have been used as reading materials for university courses on anarchism.

The collective's downtown Olympia location burned in a late 2021 fire.

Convergences

Since the summer of 2002, CrimethInc. has hosted annual conventions, termed "convergences", open to anyone. Typically featuring the performances of traveling theatrical troupes, musicians, direct-action and mutual-aid workshops from individual participants, the few-days-long camping trips have attracted coverage in newspaper articles, initiated multiple Reclaim the Streets actions, mobilized large Critical Mass events, and catalyzed many other activities.

The 2007 convergence in Athens, Ohio, saw an impromptu street party which resulted in arrests on minor charges. The Athens News characterized the convergence as "a sort of networking, resume-swapping opportunity for would-be radicals, free-thinkers, Levellers, Diggers, Neo-Luddites, and other assorted malcontents." It is typical of these gatherings to require that all attendees have something to contribute to the momentum: whether it is bringing food or equipment to share, leading a discussion group, or providing materials with which to write to political prisoners. There has been a pattern of promoting convergences as festivals, reminiscent of barnstorming flying circuses and travelling sideshows.

Harper's journalist Matthew Power described the 2006 convergence in Winona, Minnesota as follows:

These convergences have been hosted by different groups within the collective each time, typically based on the initiative of local enthusiasts. Every year a different set of policy requests is released from locals in the field, typically encouraging a sober, consensus-based space in which no financial transactions are made. The one firm rule has been "No police informants," a regulation which has been ignored by the FBI. Information gathered by FBI informants at CrimethInc. convergences (in 2004, 2005, and 2008) contributed to the convictions of Eric McDavid and his associates, as well as 2008 Republican National Convention protester Matthew DePalma.

In 2010, CrimethInc. announced the We Are Everywhere campaign of national tours and events in lieu of the traditional convergence. In 2015, CrimethInc. embarked on the similar To Change Everything two-month tour of the United States.

Music 

CrimethInc. is associated with the North American anarcho-punk scene because of its long relationship with notable musicians in the genre and its publishing of Inside Front, a "journal of hardcore punk and anarchist action". CrimethInc. releases include LP's, CD's, and 7-inch vinyl records from North American and European anarcho-punk, hardcore, and anti-folk bands. Academic Stacy Thompson has described CrimethInc. as "exemplary of a more contemporary and nuanced approach" to the possible forms anarcho-punk could take to resist commodification through aesthetic expression. However, Thompson does not consider the aesthetic choices of the collective to be substantially different from the anarcho- and crust punk bands released by fellow anarcho-punk collective Profane Existence in the mid-to-late 90s.

Philosophy

CrimethInc as a loose association represents a variety of political views; the CrimethInc. Their frequently-asked questions page asserts that it has "no platform or ideology except that which could be generalized from the similarities between the beliefs and goals of the individuals who choose to be involved—and that is constantly in flux." "CrimethInc." is an anonymous tag, a means of constructing dynamic networks of support and communication within the anarchist movement, and as such anyone can publish under the name or create a poster using the logo; each agent or group of agents operate autonomously. As well as the traditional anarchist opposition to the state and capitalism, agents have at times advocated a straight edge lifestyle, the total supersession of gender roles, violent insurrection against the state, and the refusal of work.

CrimethInc. is influenced by the Situationist International, and has been described by scholar Martin Puchner as "inheritors of the political avant-garde", For their part, the authors of the book criticized the "exclusive, anti-subjective" nature of history as "paralyzing", advocating in its place a non-superstitious myth. The collective has expressed a strident anti-copyright stance and advocacy of the appropriation of texts and ideas of others, which has attracted criticism from academic philosopher George MacDonald Ross as an endorsement of plagiarism. CrimethInc.'s N©! free license is known as an example of copyleft. It grants rights to individuals and none to corporations.

The active participants of CrimethInc. characterize it as a mindset and a way of life first and foremost, rather than as an organization per se. Its main goal is to inspire people to take more active control of their own lives, becoming producers of culture and history instead of passive consumers. Those who subscribe to the CrimethInc. philosophy advocate radical ways of living one's life to the end of eliminating the perceived inequities and tyrannies within society. Contributors to publications are generally not credited in respect of anonymity asserted by participants to be one of the organization's primary values. The name "CrimethInc." itself is a satirical self-criticism about the hypocrisy of revolutionary propaganda and other "margin-walking between contradictions", and a direct reference to the concept of "thoughtcrime" developed in George Orwell's Nineteen Eighty-Four.

References

Further reading

External links

 

 
Anarchist organizations in the United States
Anarchist publishing companies
Anarcho-punk
Anti-capitalism
Anti-consumerist groups
Anti-corporate activism
Anarchist collectives
Critics of work and the work ethic
Culture jamming
DIY culture
Post-left anarchism
Publishing collectives
Hacktivists